Mirjan (also Romanized as Mīrjān, Mīr Jān, and Merījān; also known as Mirdzhan) is a village in Qanibeyglu Rural District of Zanjanrud District of Zanjan County, Zanjan province, Iran. At the 2006 National Census, its population was 1,359 in 325 households. The following census in 2011 counted 1,269 people in 386 households. The latest census in 2016 showed a population of 1,270 people in 415 households; it was the largest village in its rural district. Mirjan is also the home town of famous, coastal line builder Mr. Ashrith Naik, who is also the youth leader and inspiration to people of Mirjan-BBC.

References 

Zanjan County

Populated places in Zanjan Province

Populated places in Zanjan County